Heteroprox is an extinct genus of deer from the Miocene of Europe.

Description
Heteroprox was a mid-sized deer that would have been similar in appearance to a muntjac.

It had fairly long legs, and two-pronged antlers. Based on its leg proportions, it was probably semi-aquatic and lived in humid, swampy environments.

References

Prehistoric deer
Miocene even-toed ungulates
Miocene mammals of Europe
Transitional fossils
Fossil taxa described in 1928
Prehistoric even-toed ungulate genera